HMAS Toowoomba (FFH 156) is the seventh Anzac-class frigate of the Royal Australian Navy (RAN). She was laid down in 2002 by Tenix Defence and commissioned in 2005.

In 2007, Toowoomba was deployed to the Persian Gulf as part of Operation Slipper. Her second deployment to the Middle East occurred during the second half of 2009. As part of this, she became the first RAN vessel to operate with the counter-piracy Combined Task Force 151.

Design and construction

The Anzac class originated from RAN plans to replace the six River-class destroyer escorts with a mid-capability patrol frigate. The Australian shipbuilding industry was thought to be incapable of warship design, so the RAN decided to take a proven foreign design and modify it. Around the same time, the Royal New Zealand Navy (RNZN) was looking to replace four Leander-class frigates; a deterioration in New Zealand-United States relations, the need to improve alliances with nearby nations, and the commonalities between the RAN and RNZN ships' requirements led the two nations to begin collaborating on the acquisition in 1987. Tenders were requested by the Anzac Ship Project at the end of 1986, with 12 ship designs (including an airship) submitted. By August 1987, the tenders were narrowed down in October to Blohm + Voss's MEKO 200 design, the M class (later Karel Doorman class) offered by Royal Schelde, and a scaled-down Type 23 frigate proposed by Yarrow Shipbuilders. In 1989, the Australian government announced that Melbourne-based shipbuilder AMECON (which became Tenix Defence) would build the modified MEKO 200 design. The Australians ordered eight ships, while New Zealand ordered two, with an unexercised option for two more.

The Anzacs are based on Blohm + Voss' MEKO 200 PN (or Vasco da Gama-class) frigates, modified to meet Australian and New Zealand specifications and maximise the use of locally built equipment. Each frigate has a  full load displacement. A Combined Diesel or Gas (CODOG) propulsion machinery layout is used, with a single,  General Electric LM2500-30 gas turbine and two  MTU 12V1163 TB83 diesel engines driving the ship's two controllable-pitch propellers. The standard ship's company of an Anzac consists of 22 officers and 141 sailors.

As designed, the main armament for the frigate is a 5-inch 54 calibre Mark 45 gun, supplemented by an eight-cell Mark 41 vertical launch system (for RIM-7 Sea Sparrow or RIM-162 Evolved Sea Sparrow missiles), two  machine guns, and two Mark 32 triple torpedo tube sets (initially firing Mark 46 torpedoes, but later upgraded to use the MU90 Impact torpedo). They were also designed for but not with a close-in weapons system (two Mini Typhoons fitted when required from 2005 onwards), two quad-canister Harpoon anti-ship missile launchers (which were installed across the RAN vessels from 2005 onwards), and a second Mark 41 launcher (which has not been added). The Australian Anzacs use a Sikorsky S-70B-2 Seahawk helicopter; plans to replace them with Kaman SH-2G Super Seasprites were cancelled in 2008 due to ongoing problems.

Toowoomba was laid down at Williamstown, Victoria on 26 July 2002. The ship was assembled from six hull modules and six superstructure modules; the superstructure modules were fabricated in Whangarei, New Zealand, and hull modules were built at both Williamstown and Newcastle, New South Wales, with final integration at Williamstown. She was launched on 16 May 2003 by Judy Blight, and commissioned into the RAN on 8 October 2005.

Operational history

Toowoomba began her first deployment to the Middle East Area of Operations (MEAO) as part of Operation Slipper on 4 January 2007.

On 18 June 2008, the frigate became the first RAN warship to fire an MU90 Impact anti-submarine torpedo, after they replaced the American Mark 46 anti-submarine torpedoes originally fitted.

In June 2009, Toowoomba sailed from Fleet Base West, Western Australia to embark upon the ship's second MEAO deployment. In September, the frigate was assigned to Combined Task Force 151 (CTF-151); Toowoomba was the first Australian warship to work with CTF-151, a US-led, multinational force tasked with protecting merchant vessels from pirate attacks off the coast of Somalia. Toowoomba was assigned to escort merchant shipping and conduct overt patrols in the International Recommended Transit Corridor (IRTC), a shipping lane extending the Gulf of Aden towards the Somali Basin and the Horn of Africa, in support of United Nations Security Council Resolutions 1846 and 1851. The frigate also operated with the counter-terrorism Combined Task Force 150 (CTF-150) in the Arabian Sea.

On 20 September 2009, Toowoomba responded to a call for assistance from the merchant vessel BBC Portugal, and successfully prevented an act of high-seas piracy. A Japanese P-3 Orion aircraft and a naval helicopter from the German frigate Bremen provided surveillance support while Toowoomba closed in. A boarding party from Toowoomba confiscated several weapons from the attackers, including a rocket-propelled grenade launcher, six AK-47 assault rifles, and a G3 assault rifle, before the skiff was directed to leave the IRTC.

The ship and her company were awarded with a "Certificate for Exceptional Services Rendered to Shipping and Mankind" by the International Maritime Organization in November 2009. The deployment is the subject of Australian Pirate Patrol, a four-episode documentary series produced by Prospero Productions, and first aired on the National Geographic Channel on 18 October 2010.

In early April 2013, Toowoomba operated with the U.S. Navy's Carrier Strike Group Three in the South China Sea.

In late March 2014, Toowoomba was pulled from asylum seeker patrols and directed to join the hunt for the missing Malaysia Airlines flight MH370, allowing  to return to port for replenishment.

Toowoomba will be docked in October 2015 to undergo the Anti-Ship Missile Defence (ASMD) upgrade. The upgrade will include the fitting of CEA Technologies' CEAFAR and CEAMOUNT phased array radars on new masts, a Vampir NG Infrared Search and Track system, and Sharpeye Navigational Radar Systems, along with improvements to the operations room equipment and layout.

In early 2020 she was deployed to the Strait of Hormuz during the 2019 Persian Gulf crisis.

Citations

References
Books

Journal articles

News articles

Press releases

Websites

External links

Royal Australian Navy webpage for HMAS Toowoomba
Australian Pirate Patrol at National Geographic

Anzac-class frigates of the Royal Australian Navy
Naval ships of Australia
2003 ships
Military Units in Western Australia